Prevelly is a townsite in the South West region of Western Australia. It is located on the coast at the mouth of Margaret River at the northern end of Calgardup Bay.

It was privately subdivided by Geoff Edwards in the early 1960s and named Prevelly; the shire petitioned for a townsite to be declared in 1977 and it was duly gazetted in 1978.

The town was named after the Preveli monastery on Crete.  Edwards was among the Australian soldiers given shelter at the St. John Monastery in 1941 prior to evacuation aboard .  To thank the people of Crete and the Monastery, he began construction of a St. John the Theologian chapel in Prevelly.  A fund for this purpose was established in 1984 and drew support from both Australian and British former service men.

The Cape to Cape Track passes through Prevelly.

Prevelly beaches and the adjacent coastline are locations of some significant surf breaks.

References 

Towns in Western Australia
Surfing locations in South West Western Australia
Cape to Cape Track